Sokhna Magat Diop (c. 1917–2003) was a Senegalese religious leader.

Life
She headed the Mouride community, of which her father had been the leader; he named her to be head of one section in 1943, having no male heirs and recognizing her abilities. In 1990 a history of her work in the community, L'Islam au féminin: Sokhna Magat Diop, cheikh de la confrérie mouride by Christian Coulon and Odile Reveyrand, was published.

References

1910s births
2003 deaths
Senegalese Muslims
Senegalese religious leaders
Female religious leaders

Female Sufi mystics
Female Islamic religious leaders